The discography of MiChi consists of three studio albums, and many singles, first released on the independent MMM Records (a subsidiary of File Records) in 2008, and from 2008 onwards released under Sony Music Entertainment Japan.

Studio albums

Singles

Promotional singles

Other appearances

References

Discographies of Japanese artists
Pop music discographies
Electronic music discographies